Jaime Correa Córdova (born 6 August 1979) also known as "El Alacran" (the scorpion) or "El Motor" (the motor), is a Mexican former professional footballer who played as a midfielder. He made his debut for the Mexico national team in the 2007 Copa América against Brazil (2–0 victory).

Honours 
Pachuca
Mexican Primera División: Invierno 2001, Clausura 2006, Clausura 2007
CONCACAF Champions' Cup: 2007, 2008
Copa Sudamericana: 2006
North American SuperLiga: 2007

References

External links 

 

1979 births
Living people
Footballers from Durango
Association football midfielders
Mexican footballers
Mexico international footballers
2007 Copa América players
C.F. Pachuca players
San Luis F.C. players
Club Necaxa footballers
Correcaminos UAT footballers
Club Atlético Zacatepec players
Liga MX players